Shanjapur is a village in Parner taluka in Ahmednagar district of state of Maharashtra, India.
Shahajapur village itself has 50-60 windmills, all over the mountains. This place is an energy center of the Parner taluka. Shahahapur also has a Dargah and A temple. It is surrounded by mountains on all the sides. It is near to Supa village.

These windmills are also seen from Pune-Nagar road.

Religion
The majority of the population in the village is Hindu.

Economy
The majority of the population has farming as their primary occupation.

Shahajapur is close to Supa, which is famous for Windmills. Shahajapur village itself has 50-60 windmills, all over the mountains. This place is an energy center of the Parner taluka.

See also
 Parner taluka
 Villages in Parner taluka

References 

Villages in Parner taluka
Villages in Ahmednagar district